Jefferson Theater was a historic theatre building located at Punxsutawney, Jefferson County, Pennsylvania. It was built about 1905, and consisted of a lobby section connected to the auditorium.  The lobby measured approximately 70 feet long and 12 feet wide.  It connects to the approximately 70 feet wide and 107 feet long auditorium.  The auditorium had a balcony and sat over 1,200.  It closed in 1978 and was Punxsutawney's only remaining theater.  It was demolished in 1998.

It was added to the National Register of Historic Places in 1985.

References

Theatres on the National Register of Historic Places in Pennsylvania
Theatres completed in 1905
Buildings and structures in Jefferson County, Pennsylvania
National Register of Historic Places in Jefferson County, Pennsylvania
1905 establishments in Pennsylvania
Demolished buildings and structures in Pennsylvania
Buildings and structures demolished in 1998